is a Japanese samurai family which was associated with Kai Province.

History
The Baba were vassals of the Takeda clan.

Select list of clan members

 Baba Torasada
 Baba Nobufusa

References

Japanese clans